Bobby Riggs defeated Welby Van Horn 6–4, 6–2, 6–4 in the final to win the men's singles tennis title at the 1939 U.S. National Championships.

Seeds
The tournament used two lists of eight players for seeding the men's singles event; one for U.S. players and one for foreign players. Bobby Riggs is the champion; others show the round in which they were eliminated.

U.S.
  Bobby Riggs (champion)
  Frank Parker (fourth round)
  Elwood Cooke (fourth round)
  Don McNeill (quarterfinals)
  Bryan Grant (fourth round)
  Joe Hunt (semifinals)
  Gardnar Mulloy (fourth round)
  Wayne Sabin (quarterfinals)

Foreign
  Adrian Quist (fourth round)
  Franjo Punčec (first round)
  John Bromwich (semifinals)
  Harry Hopman (quarterfinals)
  Henner Henkel (first round)
  Jack Crawford (third round)
  Franjo Kukuljević (first round)
  Ladislav Hecht (third round)

Draw

Key
 Q = Qualifier
 WC = Wild card
 LL = Lucky loser
 r = Retired

Finals

Earlier rounds

Section 1

Section 2

Section 3

Section 4

Section 5

Section 6

Section 7

Section 8

References

External links
 1939 U.S. National Championships on ITFtennis.com, the source for this draw

Men's Singles
U.S. National Championships (tennis) by year – Men's singles